Kazi Mohammed Shafiullah Bir Uttam (born 2 September 1934), also known as K. M. Shafiullah, is a retired Bangladeshi general, former Chief of Army Staff of the Bangladesh Army, and former Member of Parliament.

As the Second in Command of Second East Bengal Regiment, along with his battalion, he was the first Bengali officer to stage a rebellion on 19 March 1971 while 57 Bde Commander-Brig. Jahanzeb Arbab came to visit Joydevpur. He killed four non-Bengali officers of his own unit along with several non-Bengali soldiers hailing from then West Pakistan. During the Bangladesh Liberation War of 1971, he was the Second in Command of Second East Bengal Regiment that revolted with six officers on the night of 4 April 1971. He became the Sector Commander of Sector 3, headquartered in Teliapara, Sylhet. He directly participated in active combat and escaped certain death at least in two such combats. Towards the end of September he was appointed one of three brigade commanders, leading what was called the "S-force" (after his surname) during the Bangladesh Liberation War in 1971.

Shafiullah became Chief of Army Staff in April 1972. After the 15 August 1975 Bangladesh coup d'état, President Khondaker Mostaq Ahmad replaced him with Major General Ziaur Rahman.

Military career
He was commissioned from 12 PMA Long Course in 1955.

Bangladesh Liberation War

Prior to operation searchlight Major K.M Shafiullah was in 2East Bengal Regiment(EBR), Where he and other men of his company revolted and killed 4 West Pakistani officers and a few west Pakistani soldiers After open hostilities Shafiullah at that time was Sector Commander of Bangladesh Forces Sector 3. His sector was headquartered in Teliapara, Sylhet from where he commanded his troops and took part in active combats during the entire duration of the war. His sector's areas were Dhaka, Mymensingh, Sylhet and parts of Comilla (present Brahmanbaria district).

Later three brigades were formed, each identified by the initial of the commander's surname. His formation was fully structured and formalised by the end of September. As of September 1971, Commander of Sector 3 was assigned to Major A. N. M. Nuruzzaman. Major Shafiullah was among those attending the Pakistan surrender on 16 December 1971 at Race Course in Dhaka.

Chief of Army Staff
After the end of the war in December 1971, the Bangladesh government awarded him the Bir Uttam (medal) for his bravery and dedication, the second-highest military award in the country. He was appointed as the Chief of Army Staff of Bangladesh Army on 5 April 1972 by the Awami League government under Sheikh Mujibur Rahman.

On 7 April 1972, General M. A. G. Osmani resigned from his post, and the Army command was given to Shafiullah, the Bangladesh Air Force to A. K. Khandker and the Bangladesh Navy to Nurul Haq.

He was the chief of staff of the Bangladesh Army during the assassination of then president Sheikh Mujibur Rahman. During the assassination, he was kept in the dark about the plot, intelligence failed and he could not save the President. Dismissed from the position on 25 August 1975 by the following Mushtaq government, he retired from the army. He was succeeded by Ziaur Rahman as army Chief. Suspecting his intentions based on his loyalty towards Bangabandhu Sheikh Mujibur Rahman, General Shafiullah was sent overseas with an ambassadorial post, along with fellow Bangladesh Air Force Chief of Air Staff Air Vice Marshal A. K. Khandker. He was elected as an Awami League Member of Parliament in 1996.

After retirement from army and into diplomatic circles
K. M. Shafiullah was appointed the first Bangladeshi High Commissioner to Malaysia. Malaysiahat had recognised the Independence of Bangladesh very soon after the liberation war. He thereafter went onto serve as the High Commissioner to Canada and South America. He was transferred to Sweden as the Ambassador to the Scandinavian region and finally to London as the High Commissioner. K. M. Shafiullah demonstrated a natural charisma and diplomacy in dealing with international and diplomatic affairs and in transitioning good relations between Bangladesh and the countries in which he served.  During the time of serving his posting in London he was the most senior ambassador in the Commonwealth, having spent 20 years promoting the values and mission of the newly formed Bangladesh nation.

Life in politics
In 1990 he returned to Bangladesh in retirement from diplomatic service and was reintroduced into the social fabric of national service, by being elected as an MP through the Awami League political party, the party of Sheikh Mujib. He served as an MP for the constituency of Rupganj, the area from which he originated. During his tenure as MP he was responsible for creating many roads and facilitating the formation of development and job creation in the constituency. Following two terms as an MP he retired from government.

Returning to a life as a civilian and freedom fighter
Being the most senior army officer in Bangladesh, he was invited to chair the sector commanders forum in 2014. Through this association he has led marches and protests well into his late 70s to bring to account war criminals responsible for the atrocities of 1971. He has also led movements against corruption and poverty as an idealist of the revolution.

References

1934 births
Bangladesh Army generals
Chiefs of Army Staff, Bangladesh
Living people
Mukti Bahini personnel
Recipients of the Bir Uttom
Bangladesh Krishak Sramik Awami League central committee members